The Battle of Orthez (27 February 1814) saw the Anglo-Portuguese Army commanded by Field Marshal Arthur Wellesley, Marquess of Wellington attack an Imperial French army under Marshal Nicolas Jean de Dieu Soult. Soult's army was posted on a ridge to the north of the town of Orthez in southern France and in the town itself. For over two hours the outnumbered French repulsed repeated Allied assaults on their right flank, forcing Wellington to order a general assault. After a struggle, the Allies overcame the French defenses and Soult was compelled to order a retreat. At first, the French divisions withdrew in good order, but as they approached the bridge over the Luy de Béarn at Sault-de-Navailles, many soldiers began to panic. The next day Soult decided that his army was too demoralized to resist more attacks and continued his retreat. Allied casualties were about 2,200 while the French lost about 4,000 killed, wounded and captured. The battle was fought near the end of the Peninsular War.

Orders of Battle

Allied Army

French Army

Notes
Footnotes

Citations

References
  This is an excellent source for the full names of French generals.
 
  This source provided the full names of Allied generals.

Further reading
 

Peninsular War orders of battle